El Viento may refer to:

El Viento, a 1991 video game for the Sega Genesis 
"El Viento," a song by Manu Chao from his 1998 album Clandestino
El Viento (film), a 2005 Argentine film by Eduardo Mignogna